Martin James "Boz" Boorer (born 19 May 1962 in Edgware, Middlesex, England) is an English guitarist and producer most known for his work founding the new wave rockabilly group the Polecats; and later for his work as a co-writer, guitarist and musical director with Morrissey, for which he is principally known today.

The Polecats
The band Cult Heroes was formed in 1977 by Tim Worman (known as Tim Polecat, vocalist), Boz Boorer (guitarist and vocalist), Phil Bloomberg (bassist), and Chris Hawkes (drummer). After finding much difficulty persuading promoters to book them on the rockabilly circuit with a name sounding "too punk", they adopted Hawkes' suggested band name The Polecats. Hawkes later was replaced by Neil Rooney. Three years after forming, the band signed to the fledgling British rockabilly label Nervous Records, and released the single "Rockabilly Guy" in 1979.

By 1980, the Polecats had signed to Mercury Records. The same year, they released their most successful LP Polecats Are Go!. The band had UK chart success with a David Bowie cover "John, I'm Only Dancing", a reworking of "Rockabilly Guy", and another cover version of the T.Rex song "Jeepster". In 1983, they entered the charts in the United States with their song "Make a Circuit with Me". Shortly after, John Buck replaced Neil Rooney on drums. Boorer left the group in the same year but in 1989 he led a Polecats reunion which produced a live album and a new studio set. Raucous Records released a compilation album of Boz Boorer's work titled Between The Polecats in early 2001. The band tours when time permits, and the most recent gig was at The Hot Rod Hayride in Bisley, Surrey, UK, on 30 July 2016.

Morrissey
Boorer, along with guitarist Alain Whyte, joined Morrissey in 1991 when the singer assembled a new band tour in promotion of his album Kill Uncle. With Whyte, he is credited with successfully synthesizing jangle pop and American rockabilly to create a new sound for Morrissey that helped to revitalize his career. Since 1991, Boorer has worked not only as one of Morrissey's co-writers and guitarists but also as the band's musical director.

In 1994, Boorer produced for the first time a record for Morrissey: it was for the single "Interlude", a duet between Morrissey and Siouxsie, a one-off released under the banners of both artists. Boorer notably directed the strings section.

After 30 years with Morrissey, Boorer is not currently part of Morrissey's live band, and was not announced as a contributing musician to Morrissey's upcoming studio album Without Music the World Dies.  No announcement has been made as to whether Boorer's absence from Morrissey's band is a temporary hiatus, or if Boorer has left permanently.

Solo career and other work

Boorer has released solo material between his recording and touring. In 2008, he released the album Miss Pearl. Besides having a solo career, writing and playing for Morrissey and touring occasionally with the Polecats, Boorer has worked with other artists, including Adam Ant, Kirsty MacColl, Joan Armatrading, Jools Holland, and Edwyn Collins. He was in Ant's full time band in 1993-1994 for the Persuasion tour and the recording of the Wonderful album before being replaced by Kris Dollimore in 1995 due to Boorer's commitments with Morrissey.  He also worked with his wife's band, the Shillelagh Sisters, between 1983 and 1998.

In 2009, Boorer produced the debut EP by Tiguana Bibles, Child of the Moon.

He and his wife own a studio in Portugal, Serra Vista Studio. In summer 2010, Boorer recorded, produced and mixed Portuguese garage/blues/rock band Murdering Tripping Blues' second album, Share the Fire.

In 2011, Happy Martyr was formed with rapper Alex Lusty. The plan was to record some acoustic, stripped-down hip-hop, which Boorer described as "an MC fronting early Tyrannosaurus Rex". The albums One Square Mile and Nothing Like Love were released in 2012 and 2014 respectively.

In August 2012, Boorer released his fourth solo album, Some of the Parts, and the single "Slippery Forces" on Fabrique Records. The song "Saunders Ferry Lane" features the vocals of James Maker. "Sunday Morning Coming Down" is a cover of the Kris Kristofferson song. John Moore of Black Box Recorder and the Jesus and Mary Chain appears as a special guest on diverse instruments.

In June 2014, Boorer teamed up with Art Brut singer Eddie Argos for a new solo single, "Girl from Atlanta", which was included on his solo album Age of Boom in 2016 for Fabrique Records. The album included a track "Le Stalker" with vocals by Georgina Baillie.

Personal life
Boorer has been married to Lyn since 1981, and they have two daughters: Pearl-May and Billie-Rose.

Discography

Albums

Solo albums
 Between the Polecats (2001)
 My Wild Life (2003)
 Miss Pearl (2008)
 Some of the Parts (2012)
 Age of Boom (2016)
 Initials BB (2023)

With the Polecats
Polecats Are Go! (1981)
Live in Hamburg (1981)
Cult Heroes (1984)
Live and Rockin''' (1989)Won't Die (1996)Nine (1997)Pink Noise (1999)The Best of the Polecats (2000)Rockabilly Guys: The Best of the Polecats (2001)Not Nervous! Rare 1980 Demos Remastered (2006)Rockabilly Cats (2008)

With Happy Martyr
 One Square Mile (2012)
 Nothing Like Love (2014)

Singles
Solo singles
 "Slippery Forces" (2012)
 "Girl from Atlanta" (feat. Eddie Argos) (2014)
 "Age of Boom" (2016)
 "A Good Day Tomorrow" (feat. Lusty) (2022)
 "Initials BB" (feat. James Maker) (2022)

With the Polecats
"Rockabilly Guy" (1979)
"John I'm Only Dancing" (1981) No. 35 UK
"Rockabilly Guy" No. 35 UK
"Jeepster" No. 53 UK
"Make a Circuit with Me" (1983) No. 76 UK

With Happy Martyr
"Sleep Tight" (2011)
"Painkillers" (2012)
"Kiss Me Like You Stole It" (2012)
"Christmas Kisses" (2012)
"Empty Handed" (2013)
"All Lies Lead to the Truth" (2014)

Appearances/songwriting credits
Albums
Shillelagh Sisters
 Tyrannical Mex (1993)
 Sham'Rock & Roll (2002)

Morrissey
 Your Arsenal (1992)
 Vauxhall and I (1994)
 Southpaw Grammar (1995)
 Maladjusted (1997)
 You Are the Quarry (2004)
 Ringleader of the Tormentors (2006)
 Years of Refusal (2009)
 World Peace Is None of Your Business (2014)
 Low in High School (2017)
 California Son (2019)
 I Am Not a Dog on a Chain (2020)
 Bonfire of Teenagers (2023)

John's Children
 John's Children: Black & White (2011, Acid Jazz AJXCD 234)

Adam Ant
 Wonderful (1995) UK No. 24 US No. 143
 Adam Ant Is The Blueblack Hussar in Marrying The Gunner's Daughter (2013) UK No. 25 US No. 205

Singles
Shillelagh Sisters
 "Give Me My Freedom" (1984) UK No. 100.
 "Passion Fruit" (1984) UK No. 140

Morrissey
 "Sing Your Life" (1991) UK#33
 "Pregnant for the Last Time" (1991) UK#25
 "My Love Life" (1991) UK#29
 "We Hate It When Our Friends Become Successful" (1992) UK#17
 "You're the One for Me, Fatty" (1992) UK#19
 "Tomorrow" (1992)
 "Certain People I Know" (1992) UK#35
 "The More You Ignore Me, the Closer I Get" (1994) UK#8 †
 "Hold on to Your Friends" (1994) UK#48
 "Interlude" (with Siouxsie Sioux) [1994] UK#25
 "Now My Heart Is Full" (1994) †
 "Boxers" (1995) UK#23
 "Dagenham Dave" (1995) UK#26
 "The Boy Racer" (1995) UK#36
 "Sunny" (1995) UK#42
 "Alma Matters" (1997) UK#16
 "Roy's Keen" (1997) UK#42
 "Satan Rejected My Soul" (1997) UK#39 †
 "Irish Blood, English Heart" (2004) UK#3
 "First of the Gang to Die" (2004) UK#6
 "Let Me Kiss You" (2004) UK#8
 "I Have Forgiven Jesus" (2004) UK#10
 "There Is a Light That Never Goes Out" / "Redondo Beach" (2005) UK#11
 "You Have Killed Me" (2006) UK#3
 "The Youngest Was the Most Loved" (2006) UK#14
 "In the Future When All's Well" (2006) UK#17
 "I Just Want to See the Boy Happy" (2006) UK#16
 "That's How People Grow Up" (2008) UK#14 †
 "All You Need Is Me" (2008) UK#24
 "I'm Throwing My Arms Around Paris" (2009) UK#21 †
 "Something Is Squeezing My Skull" (2009) UK#46
 "Glamorous Glue" (2011) UK#69
 "Satellite of Love" (live) [2013]
 "World Peace Is None of Your Business" (2014) UK#83 †
 "Istanbul" (2014) †
 "Earth Is the Loneliest Planet" (2014)
 "The Bullfighter Dies" (2014)
 "Kiss Me a Lot" (2015)
 "Spent the Day in Bed" (2017) UK#69
 "Jacky's Only Happy When She's Up on the Stage" (2017) †
 "My Love, I'd Do Anything for You" (2018)
 "All the Young People Must Fall in Love" (2018) †
 "Back on the Chain Gang" (2018)
 "Lover-To-Be" (2019) †
 "Wedding Bell Blues" (2019)
 "It's Over" (2019)
 "Bobby, Don't You Think They Know?" (2020)
 "Honey, You Know Where to Find Me" (2020) †
 "Cosmic Dancer” (live) [with David Bowie] / "That's Entertainment" [2020]
 "Rebels Without Applause" (2022) †

† Written by Boorer

Adam Ant
"Wonderful" (1995) UK No. 32 US No. 39
"Gotta Be a Sin" (1995) UK No. 45

Songwriting credits with Morrissey
"Now My Heart Is Full", "Spring-Heeled Jim", "The More You Ignore Me, the Closer I Get", "Lifeguard Sleeping, Girl Drowning" and "Speedway" from Vauxhall and I"The Teachers Are Afraid of the Pupils" and "Reader Meet Author" from Southpaw Grammar – "Honey, You Know Where to Find Me" and "You Should Have Been Nice to Me" (only on remastered version)
"Maladjusted", "Ammunition" and "Satan Rejected My Soul" from Maladjusted"Come Back to Camden", "I'm Not Sorry", "The World Is Full of Crashing Bores" and "I Like You" from You Are the Quarry"I'm Throwing My Arms Around Paris", "That's How People Grow Up", "Black Cloud" and "One Day Goodbye Will Be Farewell" from Years of Refusal"World Peace Is None of Your Business", "Istanbul", "Staircase at the University", "Mountjoy" and "Oboe Concerto" from World Peace Is None of Your Business – "Drag the River", "Scandinavia", "Julie in the Weeds" and "Art Hounds" (only on deluxe version)
"I Wish You Lonely", "Jacky's Only Happy When She's Up on the Stage", "All the Young People Must Fall in Love" and "Who Will Protect Us from the Police" from Low in High School – "Lover-To-Be" and "This Song Doesn't End When It's Over" (only on deluxe version)
"Rebels Without Applause" from Bonfire of Teenagers''
"Jack the Ripper", "You've Had Her", "I'd Love To", "Mexico", "I Can Have Both", "Christian Dior", "Noise Is the Best Revenge", "The Public Image", "The Slum Mums", "Action Is My Middle Name", "The Kid's a Looker" and "Brow of My Beloved" are tracks that appeared on B-sides of Morrissey singles.
"Kit", "I Know Who I Love", "I'm Playing Easy to Get", "Blue Dreamers Eyes", "Diana Dors" and "I Couldn't Understand Why People Laughed" are unreleased tracks.

References

External links
Official website
Facebook Page

1962 births
Living people
English male guitarists
English songwriters
English record producers
Music directors
People from Edgware
English rock guitarists
British rockabilly musicians